Barbara Geddes (born October 15, 1944) is an American political scientist. One of the main important theorists of authoritarianism and empirical catalogers of authoritarian regimes, she is currently a full professor at the Department of Political Science at the University of California, Los Angeles. Her 2003 book Paradigms and Sand Castles is an influential research design book in comparative politics.

Research
Geddes studies various authoritarian regimes and classifies them in five typologies: Military Dictatorships, Single-party Dictatorships, Personalist Dictatorships, Monarchies, and Hybrid Dictatorships. "Geddes' (1999) categorization of personalist, party, and military regimes and her use of this classification to examine theories regarding the survival of dictatorships  and the likelihood of democratic transitions have been path breaking." In a 2014 article, the classification had seven typologies: dominant party regimes, military regime, personalist regimes, monarchies, oligarchic regimes, indirect military regimes, or hybrids of the first three. Thomas Pepinsky has described Geddes's work on authoritarianism as "path-breaking."

She is also interested in collapse of and transition between regimes. Her earlier work, "investigated bureaucratic reform and corruption in Brazil, the politics of economic policy making in Latin America, and political bargaining over institutional choice." Geddes has a regional focus on Latin America.

Major works

Awards

In 2014, the Comparative Politics Section of the American Political Science Association awarded Geddes the Bingham Powell Graduate Mentoring Award. "The Autocratic Regimes Data Set" that Geddes created with Joseph G. Wright and Erica Frantz, political scientists at Penn State University and Michigan State University, respectively, garnered the Lijphart/ Przeworski/ Verba Data Set Award in 2015, also awarded by the Comparative Politics Section of the American Political Science Association.

References 

American women political scientists
American political scientists
University of California, Berkeley alumni
1944 births
Living people
American women non-fiction writers
University of California, Los Angeles faculty
21st-century American women writers